Clarksville High School is a public high school located in Clarksville in Montgomery County, Tennessee.  It is part of the Clarksville-Montgomery County School System. The original building was built in 1906 but the school moved to the current building in 1968. Clarksville High School holds the CMCSS Business Academy which provides an open enrollment option for entering freshman for Montgomery county. Its mascot is Wiley the Wildcat. The School colors are Purple and Gold, and the sports teams wear Purple and Gold with some Black. Athletics are part of the TSSAA. The School meets expectations for the Standardized Tests and ACT's.

Athletics

Clarksville High School Football is led by Head Coach Isaac Shelby, whose accomplishments include a 45-13 record against teams in the city. Under Shelby, the team has made the playoffs ten out of twelve years at Clarksville High, with a 10-9 playoff record. Shelby has coached 13 players who have gone on to play in the Tennessee All-Star Game and 62 players who have signed to play college football, 2 of which have gone on to play in the NFL. Coach Shelby also holds the record for the most winningest coach in school history at Clarksville northeast high school. He left northeast to coach for the victor Clarksville High School in 2014.  

In its second year the 2021 Lady Cats Girls Wrestling Team had two State Champions Ella-Lina Gonzalez and Brielle Bissonette. The team won the TSSAA State Duals and placed second in the Girls Traditional State Tournament. Girls Soccer won the state title in 2014 and 2016 with a 2nd Place trophy in 2015. The women's golf team won the state title in 2016, their third.

Girls' Golf has also won multiple State Titles as well.

Notable alumni
Donny Everett, former College Baseball player at Vanderbilt
Galen Fott, director and animator
Harry Galbreath, former NFL Football player
Bashaara Graves, WNBA basketball player
Ryne Harper, MLB pitcher
Trenton Hassell, former NBA basketball player
Shawn Marion, former NBA basketball player
Wes Parsons, MLB pitcher
Robert Penn Warren, poet and novelist
 Ted Young, former JBL basketball player for the Akita Isuzu Motors

References

Education in Clarksville, Tennessee
Public high schools in Tennessee
Schools in Montgomery County, Tennessee
1906 establishments in Tennessee